Radiation-induced thyroiditis is a form of painful, acute thyroiditis resulting from radioactive therapy to treat hyperthyroidism or from radiation to treat head and neck cancer or lymphoma. It affects 1% of those who have received radioactive iodine (I-131) therapy for Graves' Disease, typically presenting between 5 and 10 days after the procedure. Stored T3 and T4 are released as rapid destruction of thyroid tissue occurs which results in pain, tenderness, and exacerbation of hyperthyroidism.

References

Cancer treatments
Thyroid disease
Radiation health effects